Francesco Pacelli (February 1, 1872 – April 22, 1935) was an Italian lawyer and the elder brother of Eugenio Pacelli, who would later become Pope Pius XII. He acted as a legal advisor to Pope Pius XI; in this capacity, he assisted Cardinal Secretary of State Pietro Gasparri in the negotiation of the Lateran Treaty, which established the independence of Vatican City.

Background
Francesco Pacelli was born in Rome into a family which for most of the 19th century was in service to the Holy See.  The Pacelli family had a long tradition of legal training. His grandfather, Marcantonio Pacelli, had been minister of finance for Pope Gregory XVI and deputy minister of interior  under Pope Pius IX from 1851 to 1870. He founded the L’Osservatore Romano on July 20, 1860. His father Filippo Pacelli, was a solicitor (lawyer) in the Congregation of the Sacred Rota.

His brother, Eugenio Pacelli, was ordained a priest on Easter Sunday, April 2, 1899 by Bishop Francesco di Paola Cassetta — the vice-regent of Rome and a family friend. After entering Vatican service, he was also chosen by Pope Leo XIII to deliver condolences on behalf of the Vatican to Edward VII of the United Kingdom after the death of Queen Victoria. In 1908, he served as a Vatican representative on the International Eucharistic Congress in London, where he met Winston Churchill. In 1911, he represented the Holy See at the coronation of King George V. Pope Benedict XV appointed Pacelli as papal nuncio to Bavaria on April 23, 1917, consecrating him as titular Archbishop of Sardis in the Sistine Chapel on May 13, 1917, the day on which Our Lady of Fatima is believed to have first appeared to three shepherd children in Fatima, Portugal.  Several years after he was appointed Nuncio to Germany, and after completion of a concordat with Bavaria, the nunciature was moved to Berlin. June 23, 1920 and 1925 respectively.

Lateran Treaty 

Francesco Pacelli  was dean of the lawyers of the Rota    and legal advisor to Pope Pius XI. In this role,  he  was instrumental in negotiating this Lateran Treaty  in 1929, which reaffirmed the independence of the Papacy  with the formation of Vatican City as a sovereign entity. Francesco Pacelli described in his Diario della Conciliazione   details and difficulties of these negotiations from a Vatican perspective. Pope Pius XI and Pietro Gasparri had entrusted to him the daily negotiations for the  Lateran Treaty. Pacelli had over two hundred protracted audiences with Pius XI over twenty different draft versions of the final treaty.

After long negotiations it consisted of three parts, which were  ratified June 7, 1929, ending the "Roman Question". They consisted of three documents:  A political treaty recognizing the full sovereignty of the Holy See in the State of Vatican City, which was thereby established; a concordat regulating the position of the Catholic Church and the Catholic religion in the Italian state, and a financial convention agreed on as a definitive settlement of the claims of the Holy See following the losses of its territories and property.  Pius XI declared that with the treaties negotiated by Pacelli, "God had been given back to Italy and Italy to God".  In gratitude for his efforts, the Pope bestowed on Francesco Pacelli the hereditary title of Marquis. The King of Italy posthumously gave him the title Prince.

Eugenio and Francesco Pacelli 

After his brother Francesco had successfully concluded the historic Lateran Treaty, Eugenio Pacelli was called to Rome  by Pope Pius XI and on 7 February 1930 appointed as  Cardinal Secretary of State succeeding his mentor and friend Pietro Gasparri.  Francesco Pacelli left the immediate Vatican service largely in light of concerns for his health problems.  As he moved to Rome, Eugenio Pacelli stayed for several weeks in the house of his brother Francesco near the Vatican, because the Vatican quarters required renovations. Madre Pascalina described the atmosphere in the Pacelli home as plain but elegant. Francesco was the soul of the house, since his wife had died years earlier. Comparing the two brothers, the older  Francesco Pacelli appeared to Madre Pascalina to be  slightly more severe than the younger Eugenio Pacelli.

The two Pacelli brothers lived there together with the  children of Francesco, Carlo, Giuseppe, a Jesuit who died shortly thereafter, Marcantonio and Giulio Pacelli. The household was in the hands of Carlo Pacelli's wife. Eugenio Pacelli lived in a small apartment within the house, which Francesco had reserved for him during his years in Germany and which he had used in previous years during his Rome visits. It consisted of two small rooms, and a chapel, where Francesco Pacelli and the family met every morning for Holy Mass and evenings for reciting the rosary.

Illness and death 
The stress of daily negotiations over the decades-old Roman Question with the Italian dictator Benito Mussolini on behalf of the Holy See had effects on the health of Francesco Pacelli. He developed a progressive heart ailment which in the last years forced him to gradually reduce his workload, fully knowing the implications of his slow-down.  "I attempted to serve God, his Holy Church and my family, he remarked shortly before his death. I trust, he will protect them and I hope to find a compassionate judge." Francesco Pacelli  died in Rome on April 22, 1935, aged 63.

Quotes

20th-century Italian lawyers
1872 births
1935 deaths
Francesco